Horseshoe Lake is a lake in Douglas County, Minnesota, in the United States. It was named from the resemblance of its outline to a horseshoe.

See also
List of lakes in Minnesota

References

Lakes of Minnesota
Lakes of Douglas County, Minnesota